Dana Dane with Fame is the debut studio album by American rapper Dana Dane. It was released in 1987 via Profile Records. Recording sessions took place at Power Play Studios, at Bayside Studios, at I.N.S. Studios and at Delta Recording Studios in New York. Production was handled by Hurby Luv Bug, except for one track, which was produced by Sam Jacobs and Sam Jacobs Jr. The album peaked at number 46 on the US Billboard 200 and number 2 on the Top R&B Albums. It features four singles: "Nightmares", "Delancey Street", "Cinderfella Dana Dane" and "This Be The Def Beat", which were charted on the Hot R&B/Hip-Hop Singles & Tracks at No. 21, No. 44, No. 11 and No. 30, respectively.

The song "Nightmares" is mentioned by fellow rapper AZ in the line "The names is changed, the games the same It's playin' fair, but years of Nightmares, like Dana Dane" from his 2005 track "Can't Stop" off of A.W.O.L. album. Snoop Dogg's song "Snoopafella" off of his 1999 album No Limit Top Dogg is based on "Cinderfella Dana Dane".

Track listing

Personnel
Dana McCleese – vocals, mixing (tracks: 1-4, 6, 8, 9), sleeve notes
Jimmy Young – backing vocals (tracks: 2, 4)
Cheryl Green – backing vocals (track 2)
Mélady – backing vocals (track 2)
Robyn Springer – backing vocals (track 4)
Lisa Dove – backing vocals (track 4)
Nedra Johnson – backing vocals (track 9)
Harvetta Lawhorn – backing vocals (track 9)
Rodolfo "DJ Clark Kent" Franklin – scratches
Hurby "Luv Bug" Azor – producer (tracks: 1-6, 8, 9), mixing (tracks: 1-4, 6, 8, 9)
Samuel Jacobs – producer & mixing (track 7)
Samuel Jacobs Jr. – producer & mixing (track 7)
Andre DeBourg – recording (tracks: 1-4, 6, 8, 9), engineering
Patrick Adams – recording (tracks: 1-4, 6, 8, 9)
Steve Ett – mixing (track 5)
Craig Bevan – recording (track 5)
Andrew Milano – recording (track 7)
Howie Weinberg – mastering
Janet Perr – design
Marlene Cohen – design
Gregory Homs – additional design
Janette Beckman – photography

Charts

References

External links

Dana Dane albums
1987 debut albums
Profile Records albums
Albums produced by Hurby Azor